Quinet is a French surname. Notable people with this surname include:

 Edgar Quinet (1803–1875), French historian
 Edgar Quinet (Paris Métro)
 Edgar Quinet-class cruiser
 French cruiser Edgar Quinet
 Hermiona Quinet, married name of Hermiona Asachi (1821–1900), Romanian writer
 Marcel Quinet (1915–1986), Belgian pianist